Band-e Mahmud (also Romanized as Band-e Maḩmūd; also known as Bon Maḩmūd) is a village in Marz Rural District, Chah Dadkhoda District, Qaleh Ganj County, Kerman Province, Iran. At the 2006 census, its population was 26, in 6 families.

References 

Populated places in Qaleh Ganj County